Pennsboro station is a historic railway depot located at Pennsboro, Ritchie County, West Virginia. It is a one-story brick building built on two sections. It was constructed by the Baltimore and Ohio Railroad, with the first section built in 1883, and the second added around 1900. It was restored by the Ritchie County Historical Museum and open as a railroad museum and community center.

It was listed on the National Register of Historic Places in 2007 as the Pennsboro B&O Depot.

References

External links
Ritchie County Chamber of Commerce

History museums in West Virginia
Railway stations on the National Register of Historic Places in West Virginia
Queen Anne architecture in West Virginia
Railway stations in the United States opened in 1883
Museums in Ritchie County, West Virginia
Railroad museums in West Virginia
Former Baltimore and Ohio Railroad stations
National Register of Historic Places in Ritchie County, West Virginia